The following is an overview of 1926 in film, including significant events, a list of films released, and notable births and deaths.

Top-grossing films (U.S.)
The top nine 1926 released films by box office gross in North America are as follows:

Events
February – The oldest surviving animated feature film is released in the Weimar Republic, directed by Lotte Reiniger. It is called The Adventures of Prince Achmed (Die Abenteuer des Prinzen Achmed).
August 5 – Warner Brothers debuts the first Vitaphone film, Don Juan. The Vitaphone system uses multiple  rpm gramophone records developed by Bell Telephone Laboratories and Western Electric to play back music and sound effects synchronized with film.
August 23 – Rudolph Valentino, whose film The Son of the Sheik was currently playing, dies at the age of 31 in New York. Riots occur at the funeral parlor as thousands of people try to see his body.
October 7 – Warner Brothers release the second Vitaphone film, The Better 'Ole, starring Sydney Chaplin.
December 5 – The 1925 Soviet film Battleship Potemkin premieres in the United States, at the Biltmore Theatre in Manhattan.
Theodore W. Case and E. I. Sponable demonstrate their sound-on-film experiments to William Fox of the Fox Film Corporation. The Fox-Case Corp. is formed in an effort to exploit the system, which is given the name Movietone. Fox begin to create Movietone News newsreels at this time. One of the first newsreels is of Charles Lindbergh's takeoff for Paris.
Al Jolson films A Plantation Act, one of the first unreleased talkies and a test film for The Jazz Singer
Ang Tatlong Hambog (The Three Humbugs), the first Filipino film to feature a kissing (make out) scene, is released in the Philippines.

Notable films released in 1926
For the complete list of US film releases for the year, see United States films of 1926

0-9
3 Bad Men, directed by John Ford, starring George O'Brien

A
The Adventures of Prince Achmed, directed by Lotte Reiniger – (Germany)
Aloma of the South Seas (lost), directed by Maurice Tourneur, starring Gilda Gray, Warner Baxter and William Powell
Ang Tatlong Hambog (The Three Humbugs), directed by José Nepomuceno, starring Dimples Cooper – (Philippines)

B
Bardelys the Magnificent, directed by King Vidor, starring John Gilbert and Eleanor Boardman
The Bat, directed by Roland West, based on the 1920 play by Mary Roberts Rinehart and Avery Hopwood
Battling Butler, a Buster Keaton film
Beau Geste, directed by Herbert Brenon, starring Ronald Colman
The Bells, directed by James Young, starring Lionel Barrymore and Boris Karloff
The Better 'Ole, directed by Charles Reisner, starring Syd Chaplin
Beverly of Graustark, directed by Sidney Franklin, starring Marion Davies and Antonio Moreno
The Black Pirate, directed by Albert Parker, starring Douglas Fairbanks and Billie Dove
La Bohème, directed by King Vidor, starring Lillian Gish, John Gilbert and Renée Adorée
Bride of Glomdal (Glomdalsbruden), directed by Carl Theodor Dreyer – (Denmark)
Brown of Harvard, directed by Jack Conway, starring William Haines, Jack Pickford and Mary Brian
Brudeferden i Hardanger (The Bridal Procession in Hardanger), directed by Rasmus Breistein – (Norway)

C
Cab No. 13 (Einspanner Nr 13), directed by Michael Curtiz – (Germany)
Cruise of the Jasper B, directed by James W. Horne, starring Rod La Rocque and Mildred Harris

D
Dangerous Traffic, directed by Bennett Cohen, starring Ralph Bushman and Mildred Harris
The Devil's Circus, directed by Benjamin Christensen, starring Norma Shearer
The Devil's Wheel (Chyortovo koleso), directed by Grigori Kozintsev and Leonid Trauberg – (U.S.S.R.)
Don Juan, directed by Alan Crosland, starring John Barrymore

F
Falešná kočička aneb Když si žena umíní (Fake Woman, or When He is a She), directed by Svatopluk Innemann – (Czechoslovakia)
Faust, directed by F. W. Murnau, starring Gösta Ekman and Emil Jannings – (Germany)
Fool's Luck, directed by William Goodrich (Roscoe "Fatty" Arbukle), starring Lupino Lane
For Heaven's Sake, directed by Sam Taylor, starring Harold Lloyd and Jobyna Ralston

G
The General, directed by Clyde Bruckman and Buster Keaton, starring Buster Keaton
The Golden Butterfly (Der goldene Schmetterling), directed by Michael Curtiz, starring Lili Damita – (Germany)
The Great Gatsby (lost), directed by Herbert Brenon, starring Warner Baxter, Lois Wilson and William Powell
The Great K & A Train Robbery, directed by Lewis Seiler, starring Tom Mix

H
Hands Up!, directed by Clarence G. Badger, starring Raymond Griffith
The Holy Mountain (Der heilige Berg), directed by Arnold Fanck, starring Leni Riefenstahl – (Germany)

I
Irene, directed by Alfred E. Green, starring Colleen Moore
It Must Be Love (lost), directed by Alfred E. Green, starring Colleen Moore

J
The Johnstown Flood, directed by Irving Cummings, starring George O'Brien and Janet Gaynor

K
Kid Boots, directed by Frank Tuttle, starring Eddie Cantor and Clara Bow

L
The Last Days of Pompeii (Gli ultimi giorni di Pompei), directed by Carmine Gallone and Amleto Palermi – (Italy)
Loetoeng Kasaroeng (lost), directed by L. Heuveldorp – (Dutch East Indies)
Love's Berries (Yagodka lyubvi), directed by Alexander Dovzhenko – (U.S.S.R.)

M
Madame Mystery, directed by Richard Wallace and Stan Laurel, starring Theda Bara and Oliver Hardy
The Magician, directed by Rex Ingram, starring Alice Terry and Paul Wegener
Manon Lescaut, directed by Arthur Robison, starring Lya De Putti – (Germany)
Mare Nostrum, directed by Rex Ingram, starring Alice Terry and Antonio Moreno
Ménilmontant, directed by Dimitri Kirsanoff – (France)
Michel Strogoff, directed by Viktor Tourjansky, starring Ivan Mozzhukhin - (France)
Midnight Faces, directed by Bennett Cohen, starring Francis X. Bushman Jr.
Miss Mend, directed by Boris Barnet and Fedor Ozep  – (U.S.S.R.)
Mother (Mat), directed by Vsevolod Pudovkin – (U.S.S.R.)
My Stars, directed by William Goodrich (Roscoe "Fatty" Arbuckle)

N
Nana, directed by Jean Renoir – (France)
Nell Gwyn, directed by Herbert Wilcox, starring Dorothy Gish – (GB)
Nelson, directed by Walter Summers, starring Cedric Hardwicke – (GB)
The Non-Stop Flight, directed by Emory Johnson

O
Old Ironsides, directed by James Cruze, starring Charles Farrell, Esther Ralston, Wallace Beery and George Bancroft
Orphan of Lowood (Die Waise von Lowood), directed by Curtis Bernhardt, based on the 1847 novel Jane Eyre by Charlotte Brontë – (Germany)
The Overcoat (Shinel), directed by Grigori Kozintsev and Leonid Trauberg – (U.S.S.R.)

P
A Page of Madness (Kurutta Ichipeiji), directed by Teinosuke Kinugasa – (Japan)

Q
The Quarterback, directed by Fred C. Newmeyer, starring Richard Dix and Esther Ralston

R
Rien que les heures (Nothing but Time), directed by Alberto Cavalcanti – (France)

S
Scared Stiff, directed by James W. Horne
The Scarlet Letter, directed by Victor Sjöström, starring Lillian Gish and Lars Hanson
The Sea Beast, directed by Millard Webb, starring John Barrymore and Dolores Costello
Secrets of a Soul (Geheimnisse einer Seele), directed by G. W. Pabst, starring Werner Krauss – (Germany)
Shivering Spooks, directed by Robert F. McGowan, an Our Gang short
The Show-Off, directed by Mal St. Clair, starring Lois Wilson, Ford Sterling and Louise Brooks
The Son of the Sheik, directed by George Fitzmaurice, starring Rudolph Valentino and Vilma Bánky
So This is Paris, directed by Ernst Lubitsch, starring Monte Blue 
So's Your Old Man, directed by Gregory La Cava, starring W. C. Fields
The Sorrows of Satan, directed by D. W. Griffith, starring Adolphe Menjou and Ricardo Cortez, based on the 1895 novel by Marie Corelli
Sparrows, directed by William Beaudine, starring Mary Pickford
The Strong Man, directed by Frank Capra, starring Harry Langdon
The Student of Prague (Der Student von Prag), directed by Henrik Galeen, starring Conrad Veidt and Werner Krauss – (Germany)
Sweeney Todd, directed by George Dewhurst, based on the 1847 stage play The String of Pearls, or The Fiend of Fleet Street by George Dibdin-Pitt – (GB)

T
Tartuffe (Herr Tartüff), directed by F. W. Murnau, starring Emil Jannings – (Germany)
Tell It to the Marines, directed by George W. Hill, starring Lon Chaney, Eleanor Boardman and William Haines
The Temptress, directed by Fred Niblo, starring Greta Garbo, Antonio Moreno and Lionel Barrymore
The Three Million Trial (Процесс о трех миллионах), directed by Yakov Protazanov – (U.S.S.R.)
Torrent, directed by Monta Bell, starring Ricardo Cortez and Greta Garbo
Tramp, Tramp, Tramp, directed by Harry Edwards, starring Harry Langdon and Joan Crawford
A Trip to Chinatown (lost), directed by Robert P. Kerr, starring Margaret Livingston
The Triumph of the Rat, directed by Graham Cutts, starring Ivor Novello and Isabel Jeans – (GB)

U
Unknown Treasures (lost), directed by Archie Mayo, based on the short story The House Behind the Hedge by Mary Spain Vigus

V
The Volga Boatman, directed by Cecil B. DeMille, starring William Boyd

W
What Price Glory?, directed by Raoul Walsh, starring Edmund Lowe, Victor McLaglen and Dolores del Río
While London Sleeps (lost), directed by Howard Bretherton, starring Rin Tin Tin
Whispering Wires, directed by Albert Ray, based on the novel by Henry Leverage
The Winning of Barbara Worth, directed by Henry King, starring Ronald Colman, Vilma Bánky and Gary Cooper
A Woman of the Sea (unreleased), directed by Josef von Sternberg, starring Edna Purviance

Y
Young April, directed by Donald Crisp, starring Joseph Schildkraut and Bessie Love

Comedy film series
Charlie Chaplin (1914–1940)
Buster Keaton (1917–1944)
Our Gang (1922–1944)
Laurel and Hardy (1921–1943)
Harry Langdon (1924–1936)

Animated short film series
Felix the Cat (1919–1936)
Koko the Clown (1919–1934)
Alice Comedies
 Alice on the Farm
 Alice's Balloon Race
 Alice's Orphan
 Alice's Little Parade
 Alice's Mysterious Mystery
 Alice Charms the Fish
 Alice's Monkey Business
 Alice in the Wooly West
 Alice the Fire Fighter
 Alice Cuts the Ice
 Alice Helps the Romance
 Alice's Spanish Guitar
 Alice's Brown Derby
 Alice the Lumber Jack
Koko's Song Car Tunes (1924–1927)
Krazy Kat (1925–1940)
Un-Natural History (1925–1927)
Pete the Pup (1926–1927)

Births
January 1 - Zena Marshall, British actress (died 2009)
January 6 – Mickey Hargitay, Hungarian-American actor and 1955 Mr. Universe (died 2006)
January 14 – Tom Tryon, actor and novelist (died 1991)
January 15 – Maria Schell, actress (died 2005)
January 17 – Moira Shearer, actress and dancer (died 2006)
January 18 – Salah Zulfikar, actor (died 1993)
January 19 – Fritz Weaver, actor (died 2016)
January 20 – Patricia Neal, actress (died 2010)
January 25 - Ted White (stuntman), American stuntman and actor (died 2022)
January 30 - Ramesh Deo, Indian actor (died 2022)
February 1 – Nancy Gates, actress (died 2019)
February 2 – Lia Laats, actress (died 2004) 
February 11 – Leslie Nielsen, actor and comedian (died 2010)
February 16 – John Schlesinger, director (died 2003)
February 20 – Gillian Lynne, dancer, actress and choreographer (died 2018)
February 23 - Dorothy Steel (actress), American actress (died 2021)
March 1 - Robert Clary, French-American actor and singer (died 2022)
March 5 - Joan Shawlee, American actress (died 1987)
March 6 – Andrzej Wajda, director (died 2016)
March 13 - Lenny Montana, American actor (died 1992)
March 16 – Jerry Lewis, American actor (died 2017)
March 18 - Peter Graves, American actor (died 2010)
March 21 – André Delvaux, Belgian director (died 2002)
March 30 - Peter Marshall (entertainer), American former game show host, television and radio personality, singer and actor
April 5 – Roger Corman, American director
April 7 
 Prem Nazir, Indian actor (died 1989)
 Gloria Warren, American actress (died 2021)
April 8
Shecky Greene, American comedian
Shirley Mills, American actress (died 2010)
April 12 – Jane Withers, American actress (died 2021)
April 14 – Gloria Jean, American actress and singer (died 2018)
April 22 – Charlotte Rae, American actress (died 2018)
April 25 – Patricia Castell, Argentine actress (died 2013)
April 29 - Leonard Fenton, English actor and director (died 2022)
April 30 – Cloris Leachman, American actress (died 2021)
May 4 - Enzo Garinei, Italian actor (died 2022)
May 5 - Bing Russell, American actor, minor-league baseball club owner (died 2003)
May 7 - Val Bisoglio, American character actor (died 2021)
May 8
 David Attenborough, English broadcaster
 Don Rickles, American comedian and actor (died 2017)
May 10
Tichi Wilkerson Kassel, American film personality, publisher of The Hollywood Reporter (died 2004)
Vladimir Tatosov, Russian actor (died 2021)
May 11 – Frank Thring, Australian actor (died 1994)
May 12 - Marilyn Knowlden, American former child actress
May 17 - María Duval (Argentine actress), Argentine actress (died 2022)
May 19 - Michelle Marquais, French actress (died 2022)
May 25 – Claude Akins, American actor (died 1994)
May 30 - Nina Agapova, Russian actress (died 2021)
June 1 
Andy Griffith, American actor (died 2012)
Marilyn Monroe, American actress (died 1962)
Aubrey Morris, British actor (died 2015)
June 5 - Lu Leonard, American actress (died 2004)
June 9 
 Mona Freeman, American actress, painter (died 2014)
 Georgia Holt,  American actress, model (died 2022)
June 10
June Haver, American actress, singer, dancer (died 2005)
Lionel Jeffries, English actor, director and screenwriter (died 2010)
June 13 – Paul Lynde, American comedian and actor (died 1982)
June 15 - Jesús Guzmán (actor), Spanish actor
June 17 - Elio Pandolfi, Italian actor, radio personality and voice actor (died 2021)
June 28 – Mel Brooks, American actor, comedian and filmmaker
July 5 – Diana Lynn, American actress (died 1971)
July 10 – Carleton Carpenter, American actor, magician, author and songwriter (died 2022)
July 12 - Sandy Ward, American actor (died 2005)
July 14 – Harry Dean Stanton, American character actor (died 2017)
July 20 – Diane Hart, English actress, inventor (died 2002)
July 21 – Norman Jewison, Canadian director
July 22 – Bryan Forbes, English director (died 2013)
July 23 - Rae Allen, American actress, director and singer (died 2022)
August 7 – Stan Freberg, American voice actor, author, radio personality and comedian (died 2015)
August 29 – Betty Lynn, American actress (died 2021)
September 19 – James Lipton, American actor, screenwriter and presenter (died 2020)
September 23 - Henry Silva, American actor (died 2022)
September 25 - Aldo Ray, actor (died 1991)
September 26 - Julie London, American singer, actress (died 2000)
September 28 - Ralph Ahn, American actor (died 2022)
October 15
Jeffrey Hayden, American director and producer (died 2016)
Jean Peters, American actress (died 2000)
October 17 
Julie Adams, American actress (died 2019)
Beverly Garland, American actress (died 2008)
October 18 – Klaus Kinski, German actor (died 1991)
October 25 – Biff McGuire, American actor (died 2021)
November 1 – Betsy Palmer, American actress (died 2015)
November 13 - Don Gordon (actor), American actor (died 2017)
November 17 - Robert Brown, American actor (died 2022)
November 25
Harry Landis, British actor and director (died 2022)
Terry Kilburn, English-American actor
November 30 – Richard Crenna, American actor (died 2003)
December 1
Allyn Ann McLerie, American actress (died 2018)
Robert Symonds, American actor (died 2007)
December 18 – Walter Lassally, German-born British-Greek cinematographer (died 2017)
December 27 – Jerome Courtland, American actor, director, producer (died 2012)

Deaths
January 30 – Barbara La Marr, actress (born 1896)
February 6 – Carrie Clark Ward, actress (born 1862)
April 20 – Billy Quirk, actor (born 1873)
March 2 – Victory Bateman, actress (born 1865)
May 7 - Lillian Lawrence, actress (born 1868)
July 22 – Willard Louis, actor (born 1882)
July 23 - Charles Avery
August 22 – Joe Moore, actor, brother of Mary Moore, Matt Moore, Owen Moore & Tom Moore
August 23 – Rudolph Valentino, actor (born 1895)
August 30 – Eddie Lyons, American actor (born 1886)
September 8 – Kisaburo Kurihara, Japanese actor (born 1885)
September 11 – Matsunosuke Onoe, actor (born 1875)
October 31 – Harry Houdini, magician & actor (born 1874)
November 7 – Tom Forman, silent film actor & director (born 1893)
November 8 – James K Hackett, stage & silent film actor (born 1869)
November 17 – Harold Vosburgh, silent film actor (born 1870)

Film debuts
 Sterling Holloway – The Battling Kangaroo
 Nancy Kelly – The Untamed Lady
 Joel McCrea – Torrent
 Franklin Pangborn – Exit Smiling
 Buddy Rogers – Fascinating Youth
 Mickey Rooney – Not to Be Trusted (as Mickey McBain)
 John Wayne – Brown of Harvard

References

 
Film by year